Musotima pudica is a moth in the family Crambidae. It was described by Thomas Pennington Lucas in 1894. It is found on Amboina, Tenimber, Fergusson Island and in Australia, where it has been recorded from Queensland.

References

Moths described in 1894
Musotiminae